Colonel John Rooke Rawlence OBE (23 September 1915 – 17 January 1983) was an English first-class cricketer. Rawlence was a right-handed batsman.

Rawlence was educated at Wellington College, Berkshire, where he represented the college cricket team. Rawlence topped the college teams batting averages in 1933.

Rawlence represented Hampshire in two first-class matches in 1934 against Northamptonshire and Nottinghamshire.

Four years later in 1938, Rawlence represented the Army in two first-class matches against Cambridge University and Oxford University.

Rawlence's final first-class match came after the Second World War in 1950 for the Combined Services against Glamorgan.

Rawlence died at Ascot, Berkshire on 17 January 1983.

External links
John Rawlence at Cricinfo
John Rawlence at CricketArchive

1915 births
1983 deaths
English cricketers
Hampshire cricketers
British Army cricketers
Combined Services cricketers
Officers of the Order of the British Empire
People educated at Wellington College, Berkshire
Royal Engineers officers
Military personnel from Hampshire
English rugby union players
Hampshire County RFU players